The teams competing in Group 4 of the 2009 UEFA European Under-21 Championships qualifying competition are Georgia, Kazakhstan, Poland, Russia and Spain.

Standings

Key:
Pts Points, Pld Matches played, W Won, D Drawn, L Lost, GF Goals for, GA Goals against, GD Goal Difference

Matches

 Match originally ended as 1–0 win for Russia. UEFA later awarded the match as a 3–0 forfeit win to Russia due to the use of a suspended player by Kazakhstan.

Goalscorers

1 goal
: Mate Ghvinianidze, Giorgi Merebashvili
: Vladimir Noskov
: Mateusz Cetnarski, Piotr Ćwielong, Radosław Majewski
: Viktor Fayzulin, Dmitry Kombarov, Oleg Kozhanov, Kirill Nababkin, Aleksandr Salugin
: Adrián, José Callejón, Gerard Piqué, José Enrique
Own goals
: Talgat Sabalakov
: Kamil Glik

Group 4
Under
Under
Under